Silver Streak is a Vekoma inverted roller coaster at Canada's Wonderland in Vaughan, Ontario. The coaster is geared towards families and children, and is often seen as a junior version of the park's existing Flight Deck roller coaster.

History 
Built alongside children's rides Jumping' Jet and Blast Off! as a brand new area known as Zoom Zone, which debuted in 2001 at the same time that Shockwave opened in the International Festival section of the park. These three family rides officially opened to the public on May 6, 2001, replacing the Jumbo Bumps attraction, and the entrance to their common plaza can be found by Frequent Flyers. Today, in the Cedar Fair era, Zoom Zone is no longer a listed area of the park but signage still covers the plaza. Silver Streak occupies the majority of the section, and is by far the largest attraction in Kidzville.

Characteristics

Model
Silver Streak was designed and manufactured by Dutch amusement firm Vekoma, who also designed the park's Flight Deck and The Bat coasters. It is currently one of seven of Vekoma's 342m Suspended Family Coaster (SFC) models, and one of 3 located at a Cedar Fair park.

Statistics
Silver Streak has an overall length of roughly 1,122.1 ft (342 m), a height of 48.6 ft (14.8 m), and a total speed of 26 mph (42 km/h). The coaster is located on a 193.6 ft by 121.4 ft plot of land.

Train
Silver Streak operates with a single 20 passenger open-air train. The train utilizes soft over the shoulder restraints, thus  minimizing any possible head-banging on the ride.

Layout
The coaster's layout is vastly similar to those of Vekoma's 335m Junior Coaster layout. After making a right hand turn, the train is pushed up the lift hill via booster wheels, all the way to the 48.6 foot height. It them proceeds into a helix and some other wide turns before hitting the brake run and making a right turn into the station. One cycle of the ride has an approximate duration of 1 minute and 16 seconds.

Similar rides
Flying Ace Aerial Chase is an identical model of Silver Streak opened that same year at King's Island in Mason, Ohio, under the name Rugrats Runaway Reptar. It was however renamed to its current name in 2010 under Cedar Fair management. Another identical model also opened at Carowinds in 2003 following the success of the first two, undergoing the same names and changes as the King's Island coaster until it's retheme to Kiddy Hawk during the 2017-2018 offseason.

References

Canada's Wonderland